"Believe in Me" is a song by American duo The Pierces, released in 2014 as the second single from their fifth studio album Creation. It was written by Catherine Pierce and produced by Christian Langdon.

A music video was released on 18 February to promote the single. The song reached No. 66 on the UK Singles Chart and No. 59 on the Scottish Singles Chart.

Critical reception
Upon release, Matt Collar of AllMusic described the song as "buoyant '60s girl group-infused", which "retain[s] all of the duo's bright and infectious lyricism". David Smyth of the London Evening Standard commented that the song "sounds like a golden hit and a startling departure from the Gothic Americana that made their name". Molloy Woodcraft of The Guardian considered the song "catchy" and highlighted the "Florence-esque bass drum and handclaps".

Lisa-Marie Ferla of The Arts Desk commented that the song was a "gorgeous drive-time radio ballad in the best of ways, all hand claps and huge choruses". Lauren James of Contactmusic.com noted the song's use of "handclaps, high production and heart-rending harmony". Andy Baber of MusicOMH wrote: "While tracks such as "Believe in Me" and "Elements" are perfectly serviceable, neither is likely to stick in the mind long after it comes to an end."

Chart performance

Personnel
The Pierces
 Catherine Pierce - lead vocals
 Allison Pierce - backing vocals

Additional personnel
 Christian "Leggy" Langdon - acoustic guitar, electric guitar, synthesizer, percussion, producer, programming, engineer
 Josiah Steinbrick - electric guitar
 Jonny Cragg - drums, percussion
 Mark "Spike" Stent - mixing
 Chris Claypool - engineer
 Bob Ludwig - mastering

References

2014 songs
2014 singles
Polydor Records singles